Royal Succession Bills and Acts are pieces of (proposed) legislation to determine the legal line of succession to the Monarchy of the United Kingdom.

A Succession to the Crown Bill is a proposed piece of legislation in the United Kingdom, presented as a Private Members Bill or Government Bill, in either the House of Commons or House of Lords, which aims to alter the laws of succession to the UK Monarchy.

The Crown is a corporation sole that represents the legal embodiment of executive, legislative, or judicial governance. It evolved as a separation of the literal crown and property of the nation state from the person and personal property of the monarch. In this context it should not be confused with any physical crown.

A bill is a proposed law under consideration by a legislature. A bill is not law until passed by the legislature and, in most cases, approved by the executive, Privy Council and monarch by royal assent. Once a bill is enacted into law it is called an "act" or "statute".

Background to succession laws
Numerous Bills and Acts of succession were used to determine heirs and potential heirs to the throne, during the reign of the incumbent monarch, and especially before, during and after the changeovers between the Tudors, Stuarts, Hanoverians, and Saxe-Coburg and Gotha to the present Windsors, all of which necessitated changes and amendments to prior succession legislation to accommodate circumstances of the day. Historically and presently, legislation to amend laws of succession generally argue for amendments to several historic acts, adjudged relevant to succession issues of the day. The Bill of Rights 1688 and the Coronation Oath Act 1688, the Act of Settlement 1700, the Union with Scotland Act 1706, the Sophia Naturalization Act 1705 and Princess Sophia's Precedence Act 1711, the Royal Marriages Act 1772, the Union with Ireland Act 1800, the Accession Declaration Act 1910 and the Regency Act 1937. The 1937 Regency Act came into legislative existence as a consequence of the abdication of King Edward VIII, as such passing succession to his brother Albert Duke of York (King George VI) in 1937, who was succeeded by his daughter Queen Elizabeth II in 1952.

Legislative procedures of bills

Pre-legislative scrutiny: Joint committee of both houses review bill and vote on amendments that government can accept or reject. Reports are influential in later stages as rejected committee recommendations are revived to be voted on.

First Reading: No vote occurs. Bill is presented, printed, and in private members' bills, a Second Reading date is set.

Second Reading: A debate on the general principles of the bill is followed by a vote.

Committee Stage: A committee considers each clause of the bill, and may make amendments.

Report Stage: An opportunity to amend the bill. The House consider clauses to which amendments have been tabled.

Third Reading: A debate on final text as amended. In the Lords, further amendments may be tabled at this stage.

Passage: The bill is then sent to the other House which may amend it.

 First Reading: Same procedures

 Second Reading: Same procedures

Committee Stage: Same procedures

Report Stage: Same procedures

 Third Reading: Same procedures

Passage: The bill is then returned to the original House.

Pre-legislative Scrutiny to consider all amendments.

The bill is then processed for royal assent, if accepted, the bill becomes an Act.

Modern bills and acts of succession

Elizabeth II
The Succession to the Crown Act 2013 is a piece of legislation in the United Kingdom which altered the laws of succession to the British throne. It was published on 13 December 2012 and received royal assent on 25 April 2013. Known as the Perth Agreement, on 28 October 2011, at a Commonwealth Heads of Government Meeting held in Perth, Western Australia, heads of government of 16 Commonwealth realms, which share Queen Elizabeth II as head of state, announced that they would introduce legislation to end the primacy of male children over female in the succession to the Crown. The Succession to the Crown Bill gave effect in the United Kingdom to the agreement between heads of government.

The argument for changing the law on succession could be stated simply: The law as it stood was considered to discriminate against women and Catholics. The Government has said that it opposes discrimination in all forms, including against Catholics. However, numerous attempts to alter the succession to remove such clauses through Private Member's bills had not been successful, and the Government thus brought forward its own legislation on the matter. Consequently, to change the law, the government sought and received consent of the fifteen Commonwealth countries that have the Queen as their head of state, under the preamble to the Statute of Westminster 1931. Amending old legislation fundamental to the British constitution raised further questions about the nature of the established church and the Union between England and Scotland.

Private Members' bills

 

Government bill

Historical bills and acts of succession

Henry VIII

The First, Second and Third Succession Acts were created to determine successors of Henry VIII, in consequence of his several wives. These circumstances evoked more legislation. In response to his excommunication; that Henry's imperial crown had been diminished by "the unreasonable and uncharitable usurpations and exactions" of the Pope, the Act of Supremacy in 1534 declared that the King was "the only Supreme Head in Earth of the Church of England" and the Treasons Act 1534 made it high treason, punishable by death, to refuse to acknowledge the King as such.

William and Mary

Historical precedence of prior succession acts usually determines later succession issues. There are several events in the history of royal successions showing why succession acts were necessary at the time of their creation. The Bill of Rights 1688 came about as a consequence of the circumstances after the Restoration of the Monarchy in 1660, and the successions of William III and Mary II, who became regents in return for accepting this Bill of Rights, and a new Coronation Oath Act 1688, from the Convention Parliament.

The Bill of Rights limited royal power and established the supremacy of Parliament. This rights bill also established the frequency of parliaments, freedom of speech in parliament, debates or proceedings not to be questioned out of parliament. This Bill also especially established that; "without parliamentary consent the king could not"; suspend or create laws, raise taxes by prerogative, or raise a standing army in peace time.

The Oath Act reiterated precedent that "By the Law and Ancient Usage of this Realm" monarchs of England took a solemn coronation oath to maintain the statute laws and customs of the country and of its inhabitants. This established a new coronation oath to be taken by future monarchs. This oath was different from the traditional coronation oath which recognized laws as being the grant of the King, whereas the Act's new oath sought the King to rule according to the law agreed in parliament.

Edward VIII

His Majesty's Declaration of Abdication Act 1936 (1 Edw. 8 & 1 Geo. 6 c. 3), was the Act of the British Parliament that recognized and ratified the abdication of King Edward VIII from the throne of the United Kingdom and the dominions of the British Commonwealth, and passed succession to his brother Prince Albert, Duke of York (who became King George VI). The Act also excluded any possible future descendants of Edward from the line of succession. Edward VIII abdicated in order to marry his lover, Wallis Simpson, after facing opposition from the governments of the United Kingdom and the British dominions. Although Edward VIII had signed a declaration of abdication the previous day (10 December 1936), he was still King until he gave royal assent to this Act, which occurred on 11 December. The Act was passed through the Houses of Parliament in one day, with no amendments.

See also
 Act Respecting the Oath to the Succession (Succession to the Crown Act 1534)
 Alternative successions of the English crown
 Church of England measures, which have the same force and effect of Acts of Parliament.
 Line of succession to the British throne
 Halsbury's Laws of England – encyclopaedic treatise on the laws of England and Wales
 Halsbury's Statutes – standard work of authority on statute law in England and Wales
 First Succession Act (Succession to the Crown Act 1533)
 Second Succession Act (Succession to the Crown: Marriage Act 1536)
 Third Succession Act (Succession to the Crown Act 1543)

References

External links 
 Text of the Bill of Rights
 The Parliamentary Archives—Holds the original of this historic record

Proposed laws of the United Kingdom
British monarchy
Constitutional laws of the United Kingdom
Succession to the British crown
Constitution of Canada
Constitutional laws of England
Constitution of the United Kingdom
Succession to the Canadian Crown
Acts of the Parliament of England
Acts of the Parliament of England still in force
1689 in law
1689 in England
Political charters
History of human rights
Glorious Revolution
William III of England
Mary II of England
1936 in law
United Kingdom Acts of Parliament 1936
1936 in international relations
Abdication of Edward VIII